Jean Krier (2 January 1949 – 12 January 2013) was a Luxembourg poet who in 2011 was awarded both the Adelbert von Chamisso Prize for the best work by a non-German author and the Servais Prize for the best literary work written by a Luxembourger. In both cases, the work in question was Herzens Lust Spiele (2010). In connection with the Chamisso prize, the jury commented on how the work provided an original and impressive enrichment of German-language poetry. "His carpets of German, subtly interspersed with sprinkles of French, are fed by experiential elements and reading experiences".

Krier was born in Luxembourg City, studied German and English literature in Freiburg, and lived and worked in Luxembourg. He contributed poems to German-language publications such as NDL (NeueDeutscheLyriker), Manuskripte: Zeitschrift für Literatur, Akzente: Zeitschrift für Dichtung, Das Gedicht: Zeitschrift für Lyrik, Essay und Kritik and Poet-magazin.

Works
"Herzens Lust Spiele", poetenladen, Leipzig, 2010
"Gefundenes Fressen", Rimbaud, Aachen, 2005
"Tableaux/Sehstücke", Gollenstein, Blieskastel, 2002
"Bretonische Inseln", Landpresse, Weilerswist, 1995

References

1949 births
2013 deaths
Luxembourgian poets
People from Luxembourg City
German-language writers
20th-century poets
20th-century Luxembourgian writers
21st-century Luxembourgian writers